Mink Creek is an unincorporated community in Franklin County, Idaho, United States.

History
Mink Creek's population was 383 in 1909, and was 109 in 1960.

References

Unincorporated communities in Franklin County, Idaho
Unincorporated communities in Idaho